GTT Communications, Inc. (GTT), formerly Global Telecom and Technology, is a multinational telecommunications and internet service provider company with headquarters in McLean, Virginia, and incorporated in Delaware. GTT operates a Tier 1 IP network, and provides Internet; wide area networking, SD-WAN; security, managed services; and voice and video transport services.

History

1998–2006
In 1998, telecom services integrator Global Internetworking Inc. was founded in McLean, Virginia. That same year, European Telecom and Technology was founded in London.

In April 2005, Mercator Partners, a special purpose acquisition company bought both Global Internetworking Inc. and European Telecommunications & Technology in 2006, merging the two companies' operations and renaming it Global Telecom & Technology, Inc. (GTT).

2006–2020
In December 2009, GTT acquired Denver-based WBS Connect in a stock and cash transaction, shifting its business model to a network operator providing IP transit and Ethernet services.

In June 2011 GTT acquired PacketExchange, a privately held UK company and operator of a global IP backbone, for $20 million in cash.

In May 2012 GTT acquired nLayer Communications, a privately held global IP backbone, for $18 million.

In April 2013 GTT acquired the Tier 1 IP network, Tinet (formerly Tiscali International Network), from Inteliquent for $54.5 million in cash and services, resulting in Tier 1 status for GTT's global IP network. In June 2013 GTT was listed on the New York Stock Exchange, under the symbol GTT.

On January 14, 2014, GTT officially changed its name to GTT Communications, Inc. In February 2014, GTT announced opening a new office in Hong Kong's Central District, bringing its total to 9 offices in 6 countries. In October 2014, GTT announced it had closed the acquisition of UNSi, a communications company providing data services to large enterprise and carrier clients.

On February 19, 2015, GTT entered into a definitive agreement to acquire MegaPath’s managed services business, which provides private wide-area-networking, Internet access services, managed services and managed security to multinational clients. On October 22, 2015, GTT acquired One Source Networks (OSN), a provider of data, Internet, Session Initiation Protocol (SIP) trunking and managed services.

On February 9, 2016, GTT acquired Telnes Broadband for $18 million.  On October 7, 2016, GTT announced the award of Government Services Administrations (GSA) IT Schedule 70 Contract. The IT Schedule 70 is the largest acquisition vehicle in the United States federal government.

On January 9, 2017, GTT completed the acquisition of Hibernia Networks for $590 million. The company acquired five subsea cables, including Hibernia Express (now GTT Express), a low latency transatlantic cable system. In May, GTT purchased IP broker and aggregator Giglinx, for $21 million. On June 19, GTT announced it was acquiring Perseus Telecom, a provider of low latency services for the financial market industry, for $37.5 million. On June 26, GTT announced it was acquiring Massachusetts-based telecommunications provider Global Capacity, for $100 million and 1.85 million shares of GTT common stock.  The deal closed on September 18.

In January 2018, GTT announced the acquisition of Custom Connect, an Amsterdam-headquartered provider of high speed network connectivity for multinational enterprises and financial services firms. On February 26, GTT announced the acquisition of Interoute, operator of one of Europe's largest independent fiber networks and cloud networking platforms, for approximately €1.9 billion ($2.3 billion) in cash. The deal subsequently closed on May 31. On March 12, GTT expanded its Canadian footprint by acquiring Toronto-based telecommunications company Accelerated Connections. On October 1, GTT acquired Cary, NC-based Access Point, a provider of communications services in the US market.

On December 2, 2019 GTT completed its acquisition of KPN International, a division of Netherlands-based telecommunications company KPN N.V., operating a global IP network serving enterprise and carrier clients.

On October 16, 2020, GTT announced an agreement with I Squared Capital to sell the infrastructure division of GTT. The division consists of a pan-European, North American, and subsea fiber network and data center assets and associated infrastructure services provided to customers which were acquired by GTT through the Hibernia, Interoute and KPN International acquisitions.

2021–present

On August 2, 2021, The New York Stock Exchange delisted GTT Communications' shares after it failed to file its quarterly and annual results.

On September 2, 2021, GTT announced that the company and certain U.S.-based subsidiaries planned to file for Chapter 11 bankruptcy in the U.S. Bankruptcy Court for the Southern District of New York as part of a Pre-packaged insolvency agreement, following the completion of the sale of its infrastructure division. The company said it expected to continue operating without interruption, with the support of its lenders. 

On September 17, 2021, GTT completed the long-anticipated sale of its infrastructure division to Miami-based I Squared Capital for total cash considerations of approximately $1.74 billion, with other cash amounts anticipated to be paid to GTT in the future, contingent on certain milestones. 

On December 16, 2021, the United States Bankruptcy Court for the Southern District of New York approved GTT’s Prepackaged Chapter 11 bankruptcy plan. The Prepackaged Plan enables GTT to improve its capital structure and execute its long-term business strategy.

Operations
The company operated a network of over 650 points of presence (PoPs).  The network spans six continents, and provides services to clients in more than 140 countries.

Internet

As of 2019, GTT was one of the five largest Internet backbones in terms of traffic.  The company's high speed Internet services include IP transit, dedicated internet access and broadband internet services. GTT also operates a 100% native dual stack (IPv4 and IPv6) carrier class network built on optical infrastructure.

Wide area networking

GTT provides WAN services, including SD-WAN, VPLS, MPLS, and Ethernet point-to-point services, which are transported across the company's Tier 1 global IP network.

Managed services

GTT offers end-to-end network management, with managed services that include managed network services and multilayered security services.

Enterprise Voice

GTT's enterprise voice services include SIP trunking, with termination services offered to more than 155 countries across the globe. GTT also offers Cloud Phone System Direct service which provides PSTN access to users via pre-established connections to software as a service (SaaS) providers of unified collaboration apps including Microsoft Teams and Cisco Webex call routing capabilities.

References 

Telecommunications companies of the United States
Companies formerly listed on NYSE American
Companies based in McLean, Virginia
Content delivery networks
Tier 1 networks
Companies that filed for Chapter 11 bankruptcy in 2021